John Reynders (1888 – 1953) was a British musician and composer who worked on the film scores of a number of films.

Selected filmography
 Moulin Rouge (1928)
 Under the Greenwood Tree (1929)
 The American Prisoner (1929)
 High Seas (1929)
 The Flying Scotsman (1929)
 Atlantik (1929)
 Blackmail (1929)
 Night Birds (1930)
 Atlantis (1930)
 The W Plan (1930)
 Loose Ends (1930)
 Why Sailors Leave Home (1930)
 Let's Love and Laugh (1931)
 Dance Pretty Lady (1931)
 The Flying Fool (1931)
 The Broken Rosary (1934)
 The Tell-Tale Heart (1934)
 Immortal Gentleman (1935)
 Midnight Menace (1937)
 Take a Chance (1937)
The Last Chance (1937)
 Save a Little Sunshine (1938)
 Night Alone (1938)
 The Mysterious Mr. Davis (1939)

References

External links

1888 births
1953 deaths
British composers
British film score composers
British male film score composers
20th-century British male musicians
20th-century British musicians